During World War II, 73 officers of the United States Army Medical Department were promoted to general officer. All are listed below with their dates of rank, most notable duty assignment during the war, and their status as of late 1946. Notes also provide other notable achievements as well as any special commemorative actions taken by the United States Army to recognize their service.

References

United States in World War II-related lists
United States Army Medical Department in World War II